The Highland Avenue bridge is a bridge that carries Highland Drive over Cedar Creek and the Columbia Mill dam and millrace in Cedarburg Wisconsin. Originally the bridge was a steel truss bridge, it was replaced in 1939  with the current bridge as a PWA project for the City of Cedarburg. The bridge is a concrete archbridge that is clad in a stone veneer (dolomite locally known as Lannon stone). It was designed by local engineer Charles Whitney who also designed the dam at the Hilgen and Wittenburg Woolen Mill upstream of the bridge and the Lakeside Park Bridge in Fond du Lac.

See also
Covered Bridge (Cedarburg, Wisconsin)

References 

Bridges in Wisconsin
Public Works Administration
Public Works Administration in Wisconsin
Buildings and structures in Ozaukee County, Wisconsin